is a Japanese film and television actor who won the award for best supporting actor at the 21st Yokohama Film Festival for Minazuki, Kyohansha and Kanzen-naru shiiku as well as the CUT ABOVE Award for Excellence in Film at JAPAN CUTS: Festival of New Japanese Film in New York in 2014.

Selected filmography

Film

Yuki no Concerto (1991)
 (1996) as Kubo
Tenzen Shoujo Man (天然少女　萬) (1996)
 (1997) as Sada
 (1997) as Hideyuki Sakata
Mukokuseki no otoko: Chi no shûkaku (1997)
Romantikku mania (1997) as Ujiie
 (1997)
Joker (1998) as Hisao
 (1998) as Sada
 (1999) as Tsuda
 (1999) as Yasuharu Nishikawa
 (1999) as Yoji
 (1999) as Ryuichi
 (1999) as Akira
 (1999)
 (2000) as Noboru Hirokawa
Himawari (2000) as Shinji Sasahara
Swing Man (2000) as Kazuki Kitaoka
Kishiwada Shōnen Gurentai: Yakyudan (2000)
Rendan (2001) as Ohsawa
Man-hole (2001) as Shin'ichi Yoshioka
Turn (2001) as Kakizaki Kiyotaka
Chinpira (2001)
Bastoni: The Stick Handlers (2002)
Onna kunishuu ikki (2002)
Jam Films (2002) (segment "The Messenger - Requiem for the Dead")
Yurusarezaru mono (2003)
 (2003) as Kanbê Inoue
 (2003) as Tamori
Kanzen-naru shiiku: Onna rihatsushi no koi (2003) as Kenji
Kill Bill: Volume 1 (2003) as Boss Koji / Crazy 88
 (2003)
 (2003)
Kyô no dekigoto (2003) as Surfer
Kill Bill: Volume 2 (2004) as Boss Koji / Crazy 88
Kaidan Shin Mimibukuro: Gekijōban (2004) (segment "Omoi!")
 (2004) as Yoshio Motoyama
 (2004) as The Controller of Planet X
Atarashii kaze - Wakaki hi no Yoda Benzo (2004) as Benzo Yoda
 (2005) as Kanbê Inoue
 (2005) as Shichibe Iinuma
Nureta akai ito (2005) as Shigeru
Maze (2006)
So-Run Movie (2006)
 (2006)
 (2006) as Masahiko Sawai
 (2006) as Chojuro Kaneko
 (2007) as Kazuma Kiryu
 (2007) as Doctor
Kaze no sotogawa (2007)
Dôsôkai (2008)
Jirochô sangokushi (2008)
 (2008) as Shunpei Kusanagi
 (2009) as Chi Edajima
Eo-ddeon bang-moon (2009)
Kirâ vâjin rôdo (2009) as Michio Keizan
Acacia (2009)
 (2010)
 (2011) as Sunil
Speed Angels (極速天使) (2011) as Asano / Onidaka
 (2012) as Ceionius
Bakugyaku Familia (2012) as Yuji natsume
Nihon no higeki (2012)
 (2012) as Akinori Natsume
 (2013) as Shinji
Jongeun Chingoodeul (2013) as Tatsuya
 (2013) as Shunpei Kusanagi
 (2013) as Shunichi Sawa
SPEC: Close (2013, part 1, 2)
The Trick Movie: The Last Stage (2014)
Killers (2014) as Nomura
The Raid 2 (2014) as Ryuichi
 (2014) as Madarame Kyutaro
Thermae Romae II (2014) as Ceionius
Man From Reno (2014) as Akira
Parasyte: Part 1 (2014) as Takeshi Hirokawa
Parasyte: Part 2 (2015) as Takeshi Hirokawa
Neko zamurai: Minami no shima e iku (2015) as Kyutaro Madarame
AIBOU: The Movie IV (2017)
Blade of the Immortal (2017) as Sabato Kuroi
The Scythian Lamb (2017) as Katsushi sugiyama
The 8-Year Engagement (2017) as Shibata
Color Me True (2018) as Ryunosuke Shundo
Last Winter, We Parted (2018) as Yoshiki Kobayashi
Pretty Cure Super Stars! (2018) as Usobakka (voice)
Million Dollar Man (2018) as Momose
The Battle: Roar to Victory (2019) as Yasukawa Jiro
Rurouni Kenshin: The Final (2021) as Tatsumi
Rurouni Kenshin: The Beginning (2021) as Tatsumi
Signal the Movie (2021) as Takeshi Ōyama
The Supporting Actors: The Movie (2021) as himself
The Great Yokai War: Guardians (2021) as Watanabe no Tsuna
Silent Parade (2022) as Shunpei Kusanagi
Hell Dogs (2022) as Tsutomu Toki
Zom 100: Bucket List of the Dead (2023) as Gonzo Kosugi
Sekai no Owari kara (2023)

TV dramas

 (NTV, 1998, Main Cast)
 (NTV, 1999, Supporting Role)
 (NTV, 2000, Supporting Role)
 (NTV, 2000) as Grey Won
 (Fuji TV, 2000) as Shōta Honma
 (NHK, 2001, Taira no Yoritsuna)
 (Fuji TV, 2001, TV Movie) as Shōgo Okino
 Episode 11 (Fuji TV, 2002) as Shinzaburō
 (Fuji TV, 2003) as Joji Manabe
 (NTV, 2003) as Kōsuke Kanda
 (Fuji TV, 2003) as Tokugawa Iesada
 (Fuji TV, 2006) as Gunji Kirishima
 (TBS, 2006) as Seiya
 (Fuji TV, 2006) as Maesono
 (TBS, 2006) as Takeshi Nakagomi
 (NTV, 2006) as Hatano
 (NTV, 2007) as Reiji Yona
 (Fuji TV, 2007) as Shunpei Kusanagi
Team Medical Dragon 2 (Fuji TV, 2007) as Gunji Kirishima
Tenchijin (NHK, 2009) as Kagekatsu Uesugi
Yokai Ningen Bem (NTV, 2011), Akinori Natsume
 (Fuji TV, 2013) as Shunpei Kusanagi
Hirugao (Fuji TV, 2014) as Osamu Katō
Kindaichi Case Files SP 2 - Gate of Jail Private School Murder Case (NTV, 2014) as Takayuki Ujie
 (BS, 2015) as Yasuhiko Kuwahara
Yamegoku: Yakuza Yamete Itadakimasu (TBS, 2015) as Kakeru Mikajima
 (Wowow, 2017)
Signal (Fuji TV, 2018)
Folklore "Tatami" (HBO, 2018)
Ōoku the Final (Fuji TV, 2019) as Tokugawa Muneharu
Scarlet (NHK, 2019–20)
The Return (Jidaigeki Senmon Channel, 2020)
North Light (NHK, 2020)
Heaven and Hell: Soul Exchange (TBS, 2021), Mitsuo Kawahara
Okehazama (Fuji TV, 2021), Oda Nobuhide
The Forbidden Magic (Fuji TV, 2022) as Shunpei Kusanagi
Wave, Listen to Me! (TV Asahi, 2023) as Kanetsugu Matō

Dubbing
Aladdin, Jafar (Marwan Kenzari)

References

External links
Kazuki Kitamura official web site 
 
 

1969 births
Living people
Japanese male film actors
Japanese male television actors
Male actors from Osaka
20th-century Japanese male actors
21st-century Japanese male actors